Tubon (also Romanized as Tūbon; also known as Tūbotn) is a village in Tameshkol Rural District, Nashta District, Tonekabon County, Mazandaran Province, Iran. At the 2006 census, its population was 1,184, in 331 families.

References 

Populated places in Tonekabon County